The DGUSA Open the United Gate Championship was a tag team championship within the Dragon Gate USA promotion. The first champions were World–1 (Masato Yoshino and Pac) and were crowned at United: Finale in the tournament final, which was held in Union City, New Jersey. It aired on March 11, 2011 on pay-per-view tape delay entitled United We Stand. The title is also recognized by Dragon Gate USA's parent promotion, Dragon Gate, and it has been defended at a Dragon Gate show in Japan. The title is also recognized by the Evolve promotion. On May 30, 2015, Gargano retired the titles after a title defense.

Being a professional wrestling championship, it is not won via direct competition; it is instead won via a predetermined ending to a match or awarded to a wrestler because of a wrestling angle. Johnny Gargano and Rich Swann were the last champions, retiring the titles in their first reign both individually and as a team.

Title history

Tournament
A three-day round robin tournament was held from January 28–30, 2011; which involved four teams. The four teams were World-1 members Masato Yoshino and Pac, Ronin members Johnny Gargano and Chuck Taylor, Blood Warriors members Naruki Doi and Ricochet, and Blood Warriors members Cima and Dragon Kid.

The tournament was points based with wins getting two points, a draw one point, and a loss was zero points.

Reigns

Combined reigns

By team

By wrestler

See also
Evolve Tag Team Championship

References

External links
Open The United Gate Championship

Dragon Gate USA championships
Evolve (professional wrestling) championships
Tag team wrestling championships